Charles D. Hudson Transitional Center is a Georgia Department of Corrections work release facility located in LaGrange, Georgia. Opened in 2003, the center houses 155 adult male offenders. Residents in the work release program are given the opportunity to obtain employment in the community and address reentry-related needs prior to release.

References
Georgia Department of Corrections

Prisons in Georgia (U.S. state)
Buildings and structures in Troup County, Georgia
2003 establishments in Georgia (U.S. state)